Sahak Mirzayi Ter-Gabrielyan (1886 – 19 August 1937) was a Bolshevik revolutionary and Soviet Armenian statesman. 

Born in Shushi to the family of a tailor, he became a member of the Russian Social Democratic Labour Party in 1902. From 1904, he was a communist activist in Baku. In 1918 during the period of the Baku Commune, he was the minister of oil and the chairman of the Emergency Commission. In 1920 he served as a member of the Revolutionary Committee of Armenia, then in 1921 became the permanent representative of Armenian SSR (later from 1923 to 1928 – of the Transcaucasian SFSR) in the Russian SFSR. From 1928 to 1935 he was the Chairman of the Council of People's Commissars of Armenian SSR (equivalent of prime minister).

In 1931, Ter-Gabrielyan openly opposed Joseph Stalin's decision to appoint Lavrentiy Beria second secretary of the Communist Party's regional committee of the Transcaucasian SFSR. In August 1937, Ter-Gabrielyan fell victim to the Great Purge. According to the official report presented to Stalin, Ter-Gabrielyan was arrested and purportedly committed suicide by jumping out of a second-floor window.

References

1886 births
1937 deaths
Great Purge victims from Armenia
Armenian people executed by the Soviet Union
Politicians from Shusha
Heads of government of the Armenian Soviet Socialist Republic
Communist Party of Armenia (Soviet Union) politicians
Armenian atheists
Soviet Armenians
People from Elizavetpol Governorate